The Gorički zbornik or the Gorica's Almanac or Gorica Miscellany or the Manuscript of Gorica is a Serbian medieval manuscript collection written by Jelena Balšić and monk Nikon of Jerusalem in period between 1441 and 1442 in the church Jelena built on the island Gorica on Skadar Lake. Its name is derived from the name of the church.

Contents 

The first part of Gorički zbornik contains a correspondence between Jelena Balšić and her spiritual adviser Nikon of Jeruzalem. Jelena wrote three epistles to Nikon who replied to her presenting a position of the church regarding different theological issues. Only one of three epistles, known as Otpisanije bogoljubno, is preserved today. The correspondence between Jelena and her spiritual adviser has its origin in a common practice in Byzantium. Scholars praised this epistle although its part was the same as hagiography of John of Rila written by Evtimiy of Tarnovo. Similarity of the medieval texts written on the Balkans corresponds with Byzantine practice and genre principle which was based on the universal and common forms, not on the individual ones.

In the second part of Gorički zbornik Nikon writes to Jelena about her ancestors using Serbian genealogies and annals as well as hagiography of Saint Simeon written by Stefan the First-Crowned and the hagiography of Saint Sava written by Teodosije.

The next part is the monastic constitution, composed on Jelena's order, to be used in the church she built on the Gorica island. A 'Tale of Jerusalem Churches and Places in the Desert' is the next part of the zbornik followed by the preaching of the faith, begging for forgiveness if there are mistakes in the manuscripts and greetings. The last part of the zbornik is Jelena's letter where she confirms that she received work of her spiritual adviser Nikon as gift which she donate to the church at Gorica.

One of the reasons why the Gorički zbornik is very important in the literature of medieval Zeta is that it is a testimony of presence and establishment of the Byzantine hesychasm on the territory which was under direct pressure of Latin Venetian policy.

Covers 

Jelena wrote her will on 25 November 1442 which shows that she had her own library and that in 1441 based on her instructions her chancellor Doberko ordered a book covers made of silver and decorated with image of Jesus from a goldsmith from Kotor named Andrija. It may be assumed that this covers were made for Gorički zbornik although it was later discovered within wooden/leather covers.

Nikon of Jerusalem 

Nikon changed his name to Nikandar of Jerusalem after he undertook greater monastic duties. Besides Gorički zbornik Nikon wrote another manuscript collection known as Šestodnev in 1439/1440 which is preserved in Savina Monastery.

References

Sources

External links 
 Photocopied original text of the Gorički zbornik
 Otpisanije bogoljubno - text of the epistle written by Jelena Balšić on Serbian

Serbian manuscripts
Montenegrin literature
15th century in Serbia
History of the Serbian Orthodox Church in Montenegro
Balšić noble family
Cetinje
Cyrillic manuscripts